The Kainji languages are a group of about 60 related languages spoken in west-central Nigeria. They form part of the Central Nigerian (Platoid) branch of Benue–Congo.

Demographics
Four of the most widely spoken Kainji languages are Tsuvadi (150,000), Cishingini and Tsishingini (100,000 each)—all from the Kambari branch; and Clela (C'lela, Lela) (100,000), of the Northwest Kainji branch. In total, there were about one million speakers of Kainji languages (1990s estimate) in Nigeria.

History
Proto-Kainji is estimated by Blench (2012) to be 3,000 to 4,000 years old. Its broken distribution today is likely due to the historical northward expansion of the Nupoid languages.

Morphology
Proto-Kainji nominal prefixes:

 *mV- for liquids and other mass nouns
 *u- for person, *ba- for people
 *kV- for diminutive and perhaps also augmentative; also found in some Plateau languages

Classification
The most divergent of the Kainji languages are Reshe, Laru and Lopa, which may form a branch together. Subclassification of the other branches is not yet clear. A bipartite division between East Kainji and West Kainji is no longer maintained, with West Kainji now being paraphyletic.

Blench (2018)
Most recent Kainji classification by Blench (2018:64):

Lake
Reshe
Upper Niger
Rop
Shen, Shuba
Central
Northwest Kainji
Kambari, Cicipu
East Kainji
Kamuku, Shiroro, Basa

Blench (2012)
Blench's (2012) classification is:

Lakes: Reshe; Laru (Shen), Lopa (Rerang)
Kainji proper (Central)
Northwest Kainji (Lela)
(branch)
Kambari, Cicipu
Basa, East Kainji
Kamuku, Shiroro

McGill (2012)
A revised classification of the Kainji languages by McGill (2012) splits Kainji into the Lake and Central branches.

Kainji
 Lake
 Reshe
 Upper Niger
 Sengwe/Laru
 Oleran/Lopa: Rop, Cuba
 Central
 Basa, Eastern
 Northwest
 Damakawa
 C'lela
 Hun-Saare/Duka; Wuri-Gwamhi-Mba, Ma'in/Fakai
 Kambari
 Cicipu
 West: Gaushi/Auna, Kimba, Wunci/Agwara
 East: Shingini/Salka, Va'di, Bangi
 Nuclear
 Shiroro
 Bauchi: Mun-Wayam, Rubo-Supana
 Gurmana
 Rin/Pongu, Waga
 Fungwa/Ura
 Kamuku-Hunwarya/Ngwoi
 Hunwarya/Ngwoi
 Kamuku
 Regi-Cinda-Kuki
 Rogo-Shiyabe, Zubazuba-East Acipa
 Shama

Gerhardt (1983)
Classification of Plateau 1a (now West Kainji) and Plateau 1b (now East Kainji) languages by Gerhardt (1983), based on Maddieson (1972):

Plateau 1a
Laru-Lopa
Reshe
Kambari cluster
Ngwoi, Kamuku cluster, Bassa-Kontagora, Ashaganna
Bassa-Kaduna, Bassa-Kuta, Gurmana, Pongo, Baushi, Ura, Bassa-Kwomu
Dakarkari, Duka, Pəku-Kəri-Wipsi cluster, Lyase
Plateau 1b
Kuda-Chamo, Butu-Ningi, Gyema, Taura, Lemoro-Sanga, Janji, Shani, Buji-Ibunu-Jere-Gus, Anaguta
Kuzamaini, Kurama, Rumaya, Ruruma, Binawa, Kono, Surubu
Kaivi, Kiballo, Kitimi, Kinuku, Dungi, Gure-Kahugu
Amo

Names and locations
Below is a comprehensive list of Kainji language names, populations, and locations from Blench (2019).

Note: West Kainji is geographical rather than genealogical.

East Kainji

West Kainji

Numerals
Comparison of numerals in individual languages:

References 

Blench, Roger. 2012. The Kainji languages of northwestern and central Nigeria.
The Kainji languages (Roger Blench)

External links
ComparaLex, database with Kainji word lists

 
Benue–Congo languages